The Basilica Abbey of San Mercuriale is the main religious building in Forlì, in Romagna (northern Italy); the rather smaller cathedral was largely destroyed by fire in the 19th century.

History and overview
A first church was built here in the 4th century, dedicated to St. Stephen. It was destroyed by a fire in 1173. The dedication to Saint Mercurialis, the local martyr and patron, had appeared in the 9th century. In 1176 the edifice was assigned to the Vallumbrosan Order.

The current edifice was finished in 1180 in Lombard-Romanesque style, along with the famous bell tower. The latter, with its height of 75 m, is one of the tallest in Italy. In the 13th century it was considered one of the marvels of the Kingdom of Italy.

The abbey, which once was located outside the ancient Roman city, was included in a new line of walls in that period. In the 15th century the Vallumbrosans' cloister was annexed to the construction: it has a rectangular shape and is decorated by slender columns, with a central well that can still be seen.

The apse of the church was rebuilt in 1585. Of the same period is also the wooden choir, designed by Alessandro Bigni from Bergamo. The façade and the bell tower are in brickwork. The former is decorated with arcades supported by columns. The magnificent rose window over the main portal portrays the Epiphany with Dream and Adoration of the Magi, and is attributed to the so-called Master of the Months, who was active also in the cathedral of Ferrara.

The interior houses numerous works of art. The most famous is the Sepulchre of Barbara Manfredi, the young wife of Pino III Ordelaffi, lord of Forlì. It was carved by Francesco di Simone Ferrucci from Fiesole. The sepulchre was once housed in the church of San Biagio, which was destroyed during World War II.

Other points of interest include:
Ferri Chapel, with an arcade in Istrian stone by Jacopo Bianchi from Ulcinj, with fine decorations and grottesche in Lombard style.
Paintings by Marco Palmezzano portraying: Madonna Enthroned with Saints John the Evangelist and Catherine of Alexandria, Crucifix with St John Gualbertus and the Magdalene and the Madonna with Saints Anselm, Augustine and Stephen, one of his finest works.
Mercuriali Chapel, with stuccoes and frescoes by Antonio Tempesta and others. It houses works by Domenico Passignano, Ludovico Cigoli, Baldassarre Carrari, Santi di Tito and Francesco Menzocchi. The construction of the chapel was promoted by eminent physician Girolamo Mercuriali, with his son Massimiliano, to honour the Saints Girolamo and Mercuriale. The chapel was finished in 1606, the same year of the death of Mercuriali who wanted to be buried in it.
Sacrament Chapel

References

External links

 The treasures of San Mercuriale in a video by Forlì TV

Buildings and structures completed in 1180
Buildings and structures in Forlì
Monasteries in Emilia-Romagna
Basilica churches in Emilia-Romagna
Mercuriale
4th-century establishments in Italy
Romanesque architecture in Emilia-Romagna